Christopher Allen, better known by his stage name Chris Stylez, is a Canadian R&B recording artist, songwriter, and producer residing in New York City. Stylez' music has received over 50 million loops of his song "Who Is" on the social media platform Vine, and appeared on the Spotify Viral 50 and U.K. Viral 10 charts. His first mainstream exposure was an appearance on the BET "Music Matters" initiative.

Stylez was born in Ottawa, Ontario, Canada and spent most of his life making music. At a young age, Stylez learned to play guitar from Ronnie "Bop" Williams from The Wailers.

In 2008, he recorded his first single "Fade Away" which gained international airplay. In 2010, he relocated from Canada to New York City in the hopes of furthering his career. He is influenced by Marvin Gaye and D'Angelo.

Discography

Albums
In Late Out Very Early, January 25, 2019

EP
Superstar, November 2013
Dreamer, June 4, 2013
Who Is, February 5, 2016

Singles
Relapse, August 5, 2016

Guest appearances
Consequence (rapper) – "Couped Up" feat. DJ Swivel & Chris Stylez on DJ Whoo Kid – BET Awards Mixtape '06, Clinton Sparks – The Cons Vol. 4 2006

Kanye West featuring Charlie Wilson & Chris Stylez – "Brothers" – Promotional Single

References

External links

21st-century African-American male singers
American rhythm and blues singer-songwriters
Living people
African-American male singer-songwriters
American soul singers
American hip hop singers
Musicians from Ottawa
Year of birth missing (living people)